St Agnes is a suburb of Adelaide, South Australia. It is around 15 km northeast of the city centre. It is located in the City of Tea Tree Gully.

Facilities and amenities on the suburb include Ardtornish Primary School, founded in 1882, and the Steventon Post Office that opened around January 1859, to be renamed Tea Tree Gully in 1872, and  Teatree Gully in 1925. Tea Tree Gully changed again in 1966 and finally became St Agnes in 1969.

Ardtornish Primary School

Ardtornish Primary School is a state government R-7 coeducational school with an enrolment of about 500 students. The original school was built in 1842 on the Lower North East Road in Hope Valley, and named after Ardtornish Castle in Scotland. In 1980 the school moved to its current site in St Agnes. An extensive history can be found on the School's website along with a slightly shorter version "for younger readers".

References

Suburbs of Adelaide